Chaparai is a village in Y. Ramavaram Mandal, East Godavari district in the state of Andhra Pradesh in India.

Demographics 
 India census, This Village had a population of 329, out of which 150 were male and 179 were female. Population of children below 6 years of age were 23%. The literacy rate of the village is 20%.

References 

Villages in Y. Ramavaram mandal